The High Power III is a luxury motor yacht built by the Italian shipyard Rossinavi.  long, High Power III was built in Viareggio, which is home to several international yacht builders.

The exterior was designed by Italian architect Tommaso Spadolini of Studio Spadolini in Florence, while the interior design is by Salvagni Architetti of Rome. The naval architecture is by Axis Group Yacht Design.

History 
Originally named the Numptia in 2008 by her first owner, an Italian-American businessman, she was delivered, after three years of construction, in July 2011. After a summer in Mediterranean Sea, Numptia took part at the 2011 Monaco Yacht Show. In autumn 2011 it crossed the Atlantic to reach the Caribbean Sea, where it was made available for charter. Just 10 months after delivery, in summer 2012, Numptia was sold to a Swiss businessman, who changed her name to High Power III.

General characteristics 
The yacht has a displacement type steel hull and an aluminum superstructure.

Awards 
Showboats Design Awards 2012 Bespoke Furniture Award for the main dining table
Showboats Design Awards 2012 Naval Architecture Award
World Superyacht Awards 2012 Judges’ Special Award for the Interior Design with the Widest Appeal
RINA Green Plus 2011

References

External links 
www.rossinavi.it

Individual yachts
Ships built in Italy
2011 ships